Carne frita is Spanish for "fried meat." It can also refer to:

Bistek, also known as carne frita in the Western Visayas islands, a Filipino dish of beef sirloin or tenderloin braised in onions, soy sauce, garlic, sugar, and citrus juices
Milanesa, also known as carne frita in the Philippines, beef sirloin pounded into thin strips, breaded, and fried